Danny Boy: The Life & Times Of A Kid In The D is the fifth studio album by American rapper Hush. It was released on October 14, 2014 also as a digital album via Danny Boy Records.

To promote his comeback record, Hush dropped music videos "So Fly"(in 2013) and "Sprinklers"(in 2014) both directed by Gerard Victor.

Due to this record, Hush was nominated for Detroit Music award in 2014 as Outstanding Hip-Hop Artist/Group, but lost to Critical Bill.

Track listing

Personnel 
 Daniel Carlisle – producer, executive producer
 Greg Calbi – mastering
 Scott Sumner – producer

References

External links 

2014 albums
Hush (rapper) albums